Mdala Game Reserve is a protected area in Mpumalanga, South Africa.

References 

 

Mpumalanga Provincial Parks